Dobroyd may refer to:

 Dobroyd Castle, castle in West Yorkshire, England
 Dobroyd Head, headland in Sydney, Australia
 Dobroyd Point, New South Wales, suburb of Sydney